Claude E. Woodruff (died June 15, 2009)  was a U.S. marine, college football player, as well as football and track coach at various high schools in Central Florida including Union Academy in Bartow, Florida. His programs produced many players who went on to college football stardom, often at Florida A&M University (FAMU). Several became NFL players. As a player, he was on the 1950 FAMU team that won the Black College National Title. As a coach his teams won five track and field state titles. He is a member of the FAMU and Central Florida Sports Hall of Fame.

Early life
Woodruff dropped out of school and served as a United States Marine in Japan. He returned to Union Academy a war hero and became a star athlete who was recruited by the coaches at Florida A&M University. As a 175-pound lineman he helped the Rattlers win the Black College National Title in 1950 playing for Alonzo “Jake” Gaither.

He planned to enlist in the Army after graduation, but FAMU coach Gaither and Union Academy principal James E. Stephens encouraged him to become a teacher and coach.

Career in education and coaching
He taught science and physical education at several high schools in the Central Florida from 1952 until 1986, including at Union Academy where his teams won five state championships in track and field. His players included Cincinnati Bengal and FAMU head football coach Ken Riley. His coaching stints also included time as Osceola High School's head coach

He also worked on a ranch and opened Osceola Q in Kissimmee. He had his recipes published in Great Black-American Cooking.

Marion County rancher Tom Silas was his uncle.

On February 25, 2002, he was interviewed about his experiences and career.

Players he coached
Ken Riley, cornerback for the Cincinnati Bengals
Nat James 
Major Hazelton, Chicago Bear after leaving FAMU
Sam Silas, Boston Patriots player

References

Year of birth missing
2009 deaths